Chris Hodges is an American diplomat, currently serving as Deputy Assistant Secretary for Assistance Coordination and Press and Public Diplomacy at the Bureau for Near Eastern Affairs at the US Department of State.

Hodges joined the foreign service in 2000 and served at the Office of Central European Affairs. He served as Head of the Palestinian Affairs Unit at the US Embassy in Jerusalem.

References

Living people
American diplomats
Year of birth missing (living people)